Epidemic Sound is a global royalty-free soundtrack providing company based in Stockholm, Sweden.

The company was established in 2009 by Peer Åström, David Stenmarck, Oscar Höglund, Hjalmar Winbladh and Jan Zachrisson.

It provides a library of over 35,000 soundtrack music and 90,000 sound effects which come with all necessary rights included. The company provides creators, from individuals on YouTube to multinational corporations, with royalty-free music and sound effects for their videos and content. All Epidemic Sound tracks come in stems, which lets users remove certain layers of a track, like drums, bass, or the melody, and find their own unique sound without having to pay for customized music. Epidemic Sound music is also played in public spaces like restaurants, hotels, shopping malls and car parks. All of Epidemic Sound’s tracks are produced by a roster of music creators who get paid upfront for each track and half of the track’s streaming revenue.

Epidemic Sound has partnered with many different major brands, including Adobe, Getty Images, iStock, Pinterest, and Canva. The company has raised a total of over $500M in funding over 5 rounds. Their latest equity round raised $450M from Blackstone Group and EQT Growth, which values Epidemic Sound at $1.4 billion. Both SVT and TV4 buy music by Epidemic Sound and believe that the compensation is reasonable and does not disadvantage musicians.

References

Companies based in Stockholm
Swedish companies established in 2009
Music companies of Sweden
Music streaming services
Entertainment companies established in 2009